John V of Saxe-Lauenburg (also numbered John IV; 18 July 1439 – 15 August 1507) was the eldest son of Duke Bernard II of Saxe-Lauenburg and Adelheid of Pomerania-Stolp (1410 – after 1445), daughter of Duke Bogislaus VIII of Pomerania-Stolp. He succeeded his father in 1463 as duke of Saxe-Lauenburg.

Life
 After a fire John V reconstructed Saxe-Lauenburg's residential castle in Lauenburg upon Elbe, started in 1180–1182 by Duke Bernard I.

In 1481 John V redeemed Saxe-Lauenburg's exclave Land of Hadeln, which had been pawned to Hamburg as security for a credit of 3,000 Rhenish guilders since 1407. John V then made his son and heir apparent, Magnus, vice-regent of Hadeln, and finally regent as of 1498.

Having advanced to regent Magnus, who in 1484 had failed to conquer the rich Land of Wursten, a de facto autonomous region of free Frisian peasants in a North Sea marsh at the Weser estuary, won his father and Henry IV the Elder of Brunswick and Lunenburg, Prince of Wolfenbüttel on 24 November 1498 as allies in a second attempt to conquer Wursten. However, on 9 September 1499 the pre-emptive feud of the joint forces of Wursten, the Prince-Archbishopric of Bremen, Ditmarsh, the cities of Bremen, Buxtehude, Hamburg, and Stade against John V and Magnus turned the latter's campaign into an adventure involving heavy losses. By early December 1499 Prince-Archbishop Johann Rode of Bremen converted Henry IV to their column so that Magnus lacked support.

Mediated by Eric I of Brunswick and Lunenburg, Prince of Calenberg and Henry IV, Rode and Magnus for his father John V concluded peace on 20 January 1500. Hadeln was restored to Magnus, while the Wursteners rendered homage to Rode on 18 August, thus in the end little had changed as compared with the status quo ante.

Marriage and issue
On 12 February 1464 John V married Dorothea of Brandenburg (1446 – March 1519), daughter of Frederick II, Elector of Brandenburg, and they had the following children:
 Adelheid (*?–died as a child*)
 Sophia  (*died latest 1497*), on 29 November 1491 ∞ 
 Magnus I (*1 January 1470 – 1 August 1543*)
 Bernard (*? – 1524*), canon in Cologne and Magdeburg
 Eric (*1472–20 October 1522*), as Eric II Prince-Bishop of Hildesheim (1501–1503) and as Eric I Münster (1508–1522)
 John (*1483–20 November 1547*), as John IV Prince-Bishop of Hildesheim (1503–1547)
 Anna von Sachsen-Lauenburg (1468–1504*), ∞ in 1490 John (Johannes Steitz?) of Lindow-Ruppin
 Frederick (*?–before 1501*)
 Rudolph (*?–1503*)
 Henry (died as a child)
 Catherine, Cistercian nun in Reinbek bei Hamburg
 Elisabeth (*1489–1541*), ∞ Duke Henry IV, Duke of Brunswick-Grubenhagen.

One of John V's illegitimate children was: 
  (in Low Saxon, ; died before 21 February 1549), auxiliary bishop in Münster and titular bishop of Ptolemais in Phoenicia (today's Akko), as of 23 March 1519.

Ancestry

Notes

References
 Elke Freifrau von Boeselager, „Das Land Hadeln bis zum Beginn der frühen Neuzeit", in: Geschichte des Landes zwischen Elbe und Weser: 3 vols., Hans-Eckhard Dannenberg und Heinz-Joachim Schulze (eds.), Stade: Landschaftsverband der ehem. Herzogtümer Bremen und Verden, 1995 and 2008, vol. I 'Vor- und Frühgeschichte' (1995), vol. II 'Mittelalter (einschl. Kunstgeschichte)' (1995), vol. III 'Neuzeit (2008)', (=Schriftenreihe des Landschaftsverbandes der ehem. Herzogtümer Bremen und Verden; vols. 7–9), ISBN (vol. I) , (vol. II) , (vol. III) , vol. II: pp. 321–388. 
 Cordula Bornefeld, "Die Herzöge von Sachsen-Lauenburg", in: Die Fürsten des Landes: Herzöge und Grafen von Schleswig, Holstein und Lauenburg [De slevigske hertuger; German], Carsten Porskrog Rasmussen (ed.) on behalf of the Gesellschaft für Schleswig-Holsteinische Geschichte, Neumünster: Wachholtz, 2008, pp. 373–389. 
 
 Michael Schütz, "Die Konsolidierung des Erzstiftes unter Johann Rode", in: Geschichte des Landes zwischen Elbe und Weser: 3 vols., Hans-Eckhard Dannenberg and Heinz-Joachim Schulze (eds.), Stade: Landschaftsverband der ehem. Herzogtümer Bremen und Verden, 1995 and 2008, vol. I 'Vor- und Frühgeschichte' (1995), vol. II 'Mittelalter (einschl. Kunstgeschichte)' (1995), vol. III 'Neuzeit (2008)', (=Schriftenreihe des Landschaftsverbandes der ehem. Herzogtümer Bremen und Verden; vols. 7–9), ISBN (vol. I) , (vol. II) , (vol. III) , vol. II: pp. 263–278.

|-

1439 births
1507 deaths
John 05
John 05